In The Name Of Tai ("Tai" translates to "elder sister" in Marathi) is a Bollywood film directed by Ujjwal V. Thengdi and starring Dr. Nishiganda Wad, Asrani, Dr. Vilas Ujawane, Mahesh Thakur, Parag Ajgaonkar and Thengdi.

Plot

The film is a female-orientated story based on a dreadful tragedy of a dedicated and educated village woman, respectfully known as Tai, who chooses a valiant but perilous avenue. She unfortunately suffers sexually as well as psychologically in her personal life, yet altruistically battles for a common cause of protecting acres of land owned by the village farmers and deprived poverty stricken village community from the clutches of the corridor of power, builders, and politicians.

Cast
 Dr. Nishiganda Wad as Sandhya Purshottam (Tai)
 Dr. Vilas Ujawane as Vilas (Minister)
 Ujjwal V. Thengdi as Subodh Ji
 Suzanne Bernert as best friend of Tai 
 Asrani as Sanjiv
 Kalpesh Mehta as Builder
 Parag Ajgaonkar as Purshottam
 Babita (Palvie)as Jani
 Mahesh Thakur as Mahesh
 Amruta Kasbekar as  Amruta
 Raquel Rebello as Shilpa Dancer sister

Soundtrack

References

External links
 
 A Rebel with a cause
 Ashutosh Gowarikar lends his support to a friend Mid Day article
  Ujjwal V. Thengdi: Dedicated filmmaker, visionary Interview at Afternoon Ujjwal V. Thengdi: Dedicated filmmaker, visionary Interview at Afternoon]

2012 films
2010s Hindi-language films